Union Grove State Park may refer to:
Union Grove State Park (Iowa)
Union Grove State Park (South Dakota)